The Partenair Mystere is a Canadian two-seat, pusher configuration monoplane that was designed by Partenair Design of Saint-Jean-sur-Richelieu, Quebec and intended for amateur construction from kits.

Two prototypes were completed and flown and one kit delivered before the project was ended. One customer-built S45 was eventually completed and first flew on 10 November 2015.

Design and development
The Mystere is an all-composite, low-wing monoplane powered by a pusher piston engine. It has a pod and boom configuration with a T-tail and a fixed tricycle landing gear with wheel pants. The cockpit has room for two occupants in tandem with dual controls and a two-piece canopy and windscreen.

The prototype S44 Mystere first flew on 16 November 1996 powered by a Rotax 912 engine. The second prototype S45 was powered by a  Lycoming IO-320 flat-four piston engine and first flew on 4 October 2001.

The kit was to be supplied in three sub-kits made from primer-surfaced parts of low-odour epoxy. The construction time from the kit was estimated to have been 1,000 hours.

Variants
S44 Mystere
Initial  Rotax 912UL powered version. Empty weight  and gross weight , cruise speed . The price of the complete S44 kit, including engine in 1999 was US$38,000. Only one prototype was flown.
S45 Mystere
Second version with increased power. Kit price in 2003, without engine, was US$27,900. Only one prototype was flown.
S45 Mystere Mark II
The engine was raised so that the aircraft could accept a larger diameter propeller and to increase clearance between the tail boom and the propeller. The engine cowling was also re-shaped to smooth airflow into the propeller. These changes were all to reduce the original S45's noise signature. Kit price in 2003, without engine, was US$27,900. Only one prototype was flown and it was the original S45 prototype in a modified Mark II configuration.
S45 Mark III RG
A proposed retractable gear model that was never built. The Mark III was announced by the company in 2003, with a first flight initially forecast for 2004.

Accidents and incidents
The prototype Partenair S44 Mystère was involved in a fatal accident on 24 October 1998. While departing Montréal/Les Cèdres Airport, the Rotax 912 engine failed and the aircraft impacted the ground, killing both occupants.

This accident led to the aircraft being redesigned as the S45 with a Lycoming O-320 engine replacing the Rotax powerplant. Kitplanes magazine described the subsequent S45 as a "repowered aircraft for better overall performance and reliability".

Specifications (S45)

References

Notes

Bibliography

External links

www.partenairdesign.com - Former location of company website
Company website archives on Archive.org
Video of the S45 Mark II on take-off

1990s Canadian civil utility aircraft
Homebuilt aircraft
Single-engined pusher aircraft
Low-wing aircraft
Aircraft first flown in 1996